Ärnäs, Sweden may refer to:

Arnäs, Älvdalen, Dalarna
Arnäs, Malung-Sälen, Dalarna
Arnäsvall in Västernorrland, Sweden
Arnäs parish in Västernorrland, Sweden

See also
Årnäs, Sweden (disambiguation)